Reinhard Divis (born 4 July 1975) is an Austrian former professional ice hockey goaltender. Divis was the first Austrian ice hockey player to play in the National Hockey League, representing the St. Louis Blues in 28 games. He also played for several teams in the Austrian Hockey League and played for the Austrian national team in several World Championships.

Playing career

His career began at VEU Feldkirch where he won the Austrian league five times in a row (1994–1998). In 1998 they also won in the finals of the European Hockey League. After VEU Feldkirch got into financial difficulties, Divis left the club and played in Leksands IF (Sweden) for two seasons.

Divis was selected by the St. Louis Blues in the 2000 NHL Entry Draft as the 261st overall pick, and in 2001 he moved to the United States. In his first season Divis played mostly with the Worcester Ice Cats in the AHL.  However, he also served as the backup goalie for St. Louis on a few occasions.  He played in one game for 25 minutes, allowing no goals on four shots.  In the 2002–03 season Divis played in two games with St. Louis (both victories), allowing one goal on 34 shots.  During the 2003–04 season, Divis saw action in 13 games, posting a record of 4–4–2 and a goals against average of 2.77.  He also played 18 minutes in one playoff game, stopping all eight shots he faced.

In the 2004–05 season, Divis played for VSV EC in Carinthia (Austria) because of the NHL lockout.  However, he played in only 29 games as a result of a shoulder injury, which also prevented him from playing in the IIHF world championship in 2005. VSV EC booked the fourth place in this season. In the goalkeeper's statistics Divis landed on the third rank with 91.96% of held shots in 29 matches.

In the 2005–06 season Divis again served as a backup goalie for the Blues, though he also saw some time with the Peoria Rivermen in the AHL.  He played in 12 games for St. Louis, posting a record of 0–5–1, with a 4.67 goals against average.  After the 2005–06 season, Divis decided to return to Austria and signed a two-year contract with Red Bulls Salzburg.

Divis also played in the Olympic games in Nagano in 1998 and in Salt Lake City in 2002 for the Austrian national team, and played with the national team in several A world championships starting in 1996.

On 9 June 2008, Divis signed a two-year contract as a free agent with Swedish team Färjestads BK of the Elitserien. In the 2008–09 season, Divis competed in just 15 games with Färjestads, under mutual agreement he returned to his homeland following the completion of the season and rejoined Red Bull Salzburg. In helping Salburg capture the Austrian Hockey League in the 2009–10 season, Divis was re-signed to an additional two-year extension on 11 May 2010.

Personal
Divis is married and has two children, Dominic and Nicole.

Career statistics

Regular season and playoffs

International

References

External links
 

1975 births
Austria men's national ice hockey team coaches
Austrian ice hockey goaltenders
EC Red Bull Salzburg players
EC VSV players
Färjestad BK players
Ice hockey players at the 1998 Winter Olympics
Ice hockey players at the 2002 Winter Olympics
EC KAC players
Leksands IF players
Living people
Olympic ice hockey players of Austria
Peoria Rivermen (AHL) players
St. Louis Blues draft picks
St. Louis Blues players
Ice hockey people from Vienna
Worcester IceCats players
VEU Feldkirch players
Austrian expatriate ice hockey people
Austrian expatriate sportspeople in the United States
Austrian expatriate sportspeople in Sweden
Expatriate ice hockey players in the United States
Expatriate ice hockey players in Sweden